Cellarengo is a comune (municipality) in the Province of Asti in the Italian region Piedmont, located about  southeast of Turin and about  west of Asti.

Cellarengo borders the following municipalities: Isolabella, Montà, Poirino, Pralormo, and Valfenera.

References

Cities and towns in Piedmont